State Route 98 (SR 98) is a state highway in the U.S. state of California. It is a loop of Interstate 8 (I-8) running west to east south of the Interstate through the border city of Calexico. It passes through the city of Calexico and ends east of Holtville. The highway was added to the state highway system in 1933, and signed as Route 98 by 1938. The highway was paved and rerouted to its current path during the 1950s.

Route description
SR 98 begins at an interchange with I-8 southwest of the community of Ocotillo. The highway intersects CR S2 and passes south of Coyote Wells before turning due east through the Colorado Desert. After over forty miles of desert, SR 98 intersects with CR S29 and then CR S30, the latter in the community of Mount Signal. The road passes over the New River and intersects CR S31 before entering the border city of Calexico, just opposite from Mexicali, the capital of the Mexican state of Baja California. SR 98 intersects SR 111, the north-south highway connecting Mexicali and El Centro, before leaving the city and continuing east through rural Imperial County. After meeting SR 7, SR 98 goes through the community of Bonds Corner before intersecting CR S33. SR 98 then parallels the All American Canal before terminating at I-8 at Midway Well.

The portion of SR 98 from SR 111 east to I-8 is designated as part of the Juan Bautista de Anza National Historic Trail auto tour route, promoted by the National Park Service. SR 98 in Calexico is part of the National Highway System, a network of highways that are considered essential to the country's economy, defense, and mobility by the Federal Highway Administration. In 2013, SR 98 had an annual average daily traffic (AADT) of 1,400 at the western terminus with I-8, and 26,500 between Rockwood Avenue and Heber Avenue in Calexico, the latter of which was the highest AADT for the highway.

History
The highway was originally designated as Route 202 in 1933. By 1934, a road headed due south from Seeley, before turning east through Calexico and curving slightly to the north and then east again through Bonds Corners. The easternmost portion of the highway was unpaved. In 1935, a contract was awarded for "grading and surfacing" the portion from East Highline Canal to Midway Wells. By 1938, the road from Coyote Wells east to the then-current routing had been constructed, but was a county road; the entirety of Route 98, which was signed, was either gravel or asphalt. Between 1952 and 1954, the western portion of SR 98 was rerouted onto the county road, moving the western terminus to southwest of Coyote Wells; however, the new portion was not paved. By 1956, the entire highway was paved. In the 1964 state highway renumbering, the highway was officially renumbered as Route 98. I-8 was extended to the western terminus of SR 98 by 1965, and to the eastern terminus of SR 98 by 1970.

Major intersections

See also

References

External links

California @ AARoads.com - State Route 98
Caltrans: Route 98 highway conditions
California Highways: SR 98

098
State Route 098
Calexico, California
El Centro metropolitan area